Scissurella morretesi is a species of minute sea snail, a marine gastropod mollusk or micromollusk in the family Scissurellidae, the little slit snails.

Description
The shell grows to  a height of 0.6 mm.

Distribution
This species occurs in the Atlantic Ocean off East Brazil.

References

 Montouchet, P. C. 1972. Three new species of Scissurellidae (Gastropoda, Prosobranchia) from the coast of Brazil. Boletim do Instituto Oceanográfico, São Paulo 21: 1-13

External links
 To Biodiversity Heritage Library (2 publications)
 To Encyclopedia of Life
 To World Register of Marine Species

Scissurellidae
Gastropods described in 1972